Glyphodes rubrocinctalis is a moth in the family Crambidae. It was described by Achille Guenée in 1854. It is found in French Guiana, Cuba, Honduras and Costa Rica.

References

Moths described in 1854
Glyphodes